Ermis (Α-373) ("Hermes") was an auxiliary ship of the Hellenic Navy, which served from 1988 to 2002 as an electronic surveillance ship.

She started her career as the 1500 tn trawler Hoheweg. In 1961 she was converted to an electronic surveillance ship  by the German Navy and named Oker (A-53). In German Navy service she was classified as a Flottendienstboot (fleet service vessel), in Class 422.

In 1988 she was decommissioned and transferred to the Hellenic Navy, where she served under Hellenic Destroyers Command as a signals intelligence gathering ship. In 2002 she was decommissioned and sold for scrap.

References

Ermis
1961 ships